Visitors to Cape Verde must obtain a visa to enter, unless they come from one of the visa-exempt countries, which are mostly in Africa, Europe and the Americas. Visas may be obtained in advance from a Cape Verde embassy or consulate, or in person upon arrival at any of the international airports.

Visa policy map

Visa policy 

Citizens of the following 61 countries and territories can visit Cape Verde without a visa.

(but must register online, preferably five days prior to arrival and also pay the airport security fee of CVE 3400 either online or on arrival):

A visa is not required for holders of diplomatic or service passports.

A visa is not required for former citizens of Cape Verde and their spouses and children.

Visa on arrival
Visitors from all other non-visa-exempt countries except  may obtain a visa on arrival at Sal, Boa Vista, São Vicente or Santiago international airports.

See also

 Visa requirements for Cape Verdean citizens

References 

Cape Verde
Foreign relations of Cape Verde